Dr. Heckyll and Mr. Jive (a parody of Strange Case of Dr Jekyll and Mr Hyde by Robert Louis Stevenson) may refer to:

Music
 Dr. Heckle and Mr. Jive (England Dan & John Ford Coley album), 1979
 Dr Heckle and Mr Jive (Pigbag album), 1982
 "Dr. Heckyll & Mr. Jive" (song), 1982 song by Men at Work

See also

Dr. Jekyll and Mr. Hyde (disambiguation)